This is a partial list of organizations that are officially banned in Russia as "extremist" or declared undesirable. Many organizations were banned based on the Russian foreign agent law and Russian undesirable organizations law. Among them were Open Russia, National Endowment for Democracy, Open Society Foundations, U.S. Russia Foundation, International Republican Institute, Media Development Investment Fund and National Democratic Institute.

Banned organisations

Before 2014
 Hizb ut-Tahrir (banned in 2003)
 National Bolshevik Party (banned on 19 April 2007)
 National Socialist Society (banned on  1 February 2010) 
 Slavic Union  (banned on 27 April 2010)
 United Vilayat of Kabarda-Balkaria-Karachay (banned on 9 July 2010)
 Takfir wal-Hijra (banned on 15 September 2010)
 Format18 (banned on 20 December 2010)
 Russian National Unity (banned on 24 December 2010)
 Russian all-national union (banned on 30 May 2011)
 Movement Against Illegal Immigration (banned on 18 April 2011)

Since 2014
 Jehovah's Witnesses (banned on 20 April 2017)
 Open Russia
 National Endowment for Democracy
 U.S. Russia Foundation
 International Republican Institute
 Media Development Investment Fund 
 National Democratic Institute
 Mejlis of the Crimean Tatar People (Banned on 26 April 2016)

See also
 Federal List of Extremist Materials

Notes

External links
List of Extremist Organisations - official website of the Ministry of Justice of the Russian Federation
"Inventing Extremists: The Impact of Russian Anti-Extremism Policies on Freedom of Religion or Belief" - website of the United States Commission on International Religious Freedom

Law of Russia
Banned political parties in Russia
Political extremism in Russia